Pyrgulina sowerbyi is a species of sea snail, a marine gastropod mollusk in the family Pyramidellidae, the pyrams and their allies.

Homonymy
This is a replacement name for Odostomia pretiosa Turtom, 1932 on grounds of secondary homonymy with Pyrgulina pretiosa Dautzenberg & Fischer, 1906, however such homonymy did not exist at the time of replacement as Saurin (1962) had transferred the senior name to Miralda (see ICZN Article 59.2). Aartsen & Corgan's name will be needed if the taxa are regarded as congeneric in the future.

References

 Turton W.H. (1932). Marine Shells of Port Alfred, S. Africa. Humphrey Milford, London, xvi + 331 pp., 70 pls.
 Higo, S. & Goto, Y. (1993) A Systematic List of Molluscan Shells from the Japanese Is. and the Adjacent Area. Elle Scientific Publications, Yao, Japan, xxii + 693 + 13 + 149 pp.
 van Aartsen J.J. & Corgan J.X. (1996) South African pyramidellacean gastropod names. Basteria 60: 153-160

External links
  To World Register of Marine Species    Text was copied from this source, which is available under a  Creative Commons Attribution 4.0 International License.

Pyramidellidae
Gastropods described in 1932